Gondek-e Seh (also known as Kondek-e Seh) is a village in Gazin Rural District, Raghiveh District, Haftgel County, Khuzestan Province, Iran. At the 2006 census, its population was 153, in 25 families.

References 

Populated places in Haftkel County